= Julianne Aguilar =

American artist and writer

Julianne Aguilar is an artist and writer. She wrote "We've Always Hated Girls on the Internet: A Wayback Machine Investigation", a story about internet harassment and internet vulnerability. She is interested in the way people create identities through their presence on the internet. Her work focuses on her appeal to the ability for the modern world to be able to connect though social media platforms and other forms of internet communication. She works primarily in digital media and video-making. She currently lives in Albuquerque, New Mexico.

== Education ==
Aguilar received her BFA in Photography at the College of Visual Art and Design, University of North Texas in 2009. In 2016, she got her MFA in Electronic Arts at the Department of Art and Art History, University of New Mexico.

== Works of art ==
fragility (2025) is a web-based project about the artist's years growing up on the internet, and how vulnerable she was at that time. julianne (2024) is a web-based project that reflects a year-long exploration into both appearing and disappearing on the internet. tuesday (2022) is a web-based project that tells an abstract and mysterious story about a woman in crisis. Time to Die (2018) is a video project that uses animation and subtext. Evidence (2018) is an ongoing project about her failed attempt to log-in to internet accounts to locate her identity. Selfies (2018) is also an on-going project that documents photographs, images, and other graphics that Aguilar identifies as self-portraits.

== Publications ==
- 2024 "julianne"
- 2018 "We Have Always Hated Girls Online"
- 2017 "The Names We Leave Behind
- 2014 "Net Chick"

== Exhibitions ==
- 2025 some websites, Alpaca Gallery
- 2017 There Are No Girls On The Internet, Localhost Gallery
- 2017 Take Me Away, Friends and Neighbours Gallery, Montreal, Quebec, Canada
- 2016 Fwd:<no-reply>, The Alice, Seattle, WA
